The Omineca Arc or Omineca Belt was a Jurassic through Cretaceous volcanic arc terrane in western North America, extending from Alaska through Yukon and British Columbia to Washington. The Omineca is bounded by the Foreland Belt to the east and the Intermontane Belt to the west. It is named after the Omineca Mountains of north-central British Columbia.

See also

References

Volcanic arcs
Volcanism of Alaska
Volcanism of Yukon
Volcanism of British Columbia
Volcanism of Washington (state)
Natural history of Alaska
Natural history of Yukon
Natural history of British Columbia
Natural history of Washington (state)
Terranes